Lophozozymus pictor, the mosaic reef crab is a species of crab in the family Xanthidae.

Description and etymology 
The word "pictor" in Latin means painter.

Its pincers are short, both about equal size, with black tips. It has walking legs that are hairy with pointed tips.

Distribution and ecology 
Lophozozymus pictor is found in China, Indonesia, Japan, Philippines, Singapore, Thailand, Vietnam, Australia, and lastly, French Polynesia. (native)

In the Philippines, this is known as Calintugas. They live along the coral areas of Batangas, Mindoro, Sorsogon, Negros Oriental, and Samar.

Toxicity 
This is known to be one of the most poisonous crabs in the world. Its neurotoxin does not get denatured by heat even when cooked.

References 

Xanthoidea